Marjorie Magri, (born on May 2, 1986 in Caracas, Venezuela), is a Venezuelan actress and model.

Filmography

Television

References

External links 
 

1986 births
Living people
Venezuelan telenovela actresses
21st-century Venezuelan actresses
Venezuelan female models
People from Caracas